Terence Cameron Medwin (born 25 September 1932 in Swansea, Glamorgan) is a Welsh former international footballer who played as a winger.

Club career
Medwin made his debut for his 'home town' team Swansea Town in 1951–52 and went on to make 148 Football League appearances for the Swans.

Medwin moved to Tottenham Hotspur for £25,000 in May 1956. He scored twice on his debut in a 4–1 victory over Preston North End at Deepdale in August 1956. And Medwin played for Spurs until 1963 when a broken leg forced his early retirement. During this period he scored 72 goals in 215 matches in all competitions and helped the club win the Double in 1960–61, and he also appeared for them in the victorious 1962 FA Cup Final.

International career
Medwin represented Wales in the 1958 FIFA World Cup, scoring the game-winning goal in the first round play-off which sent Wales to the quarter-finals. He was the last player to score for Wales in the finals of a major tournament, until Gareth Bale scored in Wales' opening game of UEFA Euro 2016. In total he earned 30 caps and scored 6 goals for Wales from 1953 to 1963.

After retirement
After his playing career ended, Medwin managed Cheshunt, coached at Cardiff City, Fulham, Norwich City and was assistant manager to John Toshack at Swansea. In 1971, he was the trainer of a Wales XI side that toured Asia and Oceania, and which was managed by Dave Bowen.

Honours
Tottenham Hotspur
 Football League First Division: 1960–61
 FA Cup: 1960–61, 1961–62
 FA Community Shield: 1961, 1962
 UEFA Cup Winners' Cup: 1962–63

References

Welsh footballers
Association football wingers
English Football League players
Wales international footballers
Swansea City A.F.C. players
Tottenham Hotspur F.C. players
1958 FIFA World Cup players
1932 births
Living people
Footballers from Swansea
London XI players
Welsh football managers
Cheshunt F.C. managers
Fulham F.C. non-playing staff
Swansea City A.F.C. non-playing staff
FA Cup Final players